Money Island may refer to;

Asia
Money Island, Myanmar, in the Mergui Archipelago
Money Island, Paracel Islands, in the South China Sea

United States
Money Island (Branford, Connecticut), one of the Thimble Islands
Money Island, New Jersey, a community in Downe Township, Cumberland County, New Jersey
Money Island, Salem County, New Jersey, a community in Elsinboro Township, New Jersey
Money Island, near Hollins Island, in the Great South Bay off of Long Island, New York